The 1975 Kentucky Derby was the 101st running of the Kentucky Derby. The race took place on May 3, 1975, with 113,324 people in attendance.

Full results

References

1975
Kentucky Derby
Derby
Kentucky
Kentucky Derby